Private E. Michael Burk (1847 – February 3, 1878) was an Irish soldier who fought in the American Civil War. Burk received the United States' highest award for bravery during combat, the Medal of Honor, for his action during the Battle of Spotsylvania Court House in Virginia on 12 May 1864. He was honored with the award on 1 December 1864.

Biography
Burk was born in Ireland in 1847. He joined the 125th New York Infantry in August 1862, claiming to be 18 years old. He was captured following the Battle of Harpers Ferry, but was paroled the next day. After his Medal of Honor action, he remained in the hospital until his regiment was mustered out. Burk died on 3 February 1878 and his remains are interred at the St. Mary's Cemetery.

Medal of Honor citation

See also

List of American Civil War Medal of Honor recipients: A–F

References

1847 births
1878 deaths
19th-century Irish people
Irish-born Medal of Honor recipients
Irish emigrants to the United States (before 1923)
People of New York (state) in the American Civil War
Union Army officers
United States Army Medal of Honor recipients
American Civil War recipients of the Medal of Honor